The Progressive Citizens' Party in Liechtenstein (FBP) is a national-conservative political party in Liechtenstein. The FBP is one of the two major political parties in Liechtenstein, along with the liberal-conservative Patriotic Union. Founded in 1918 along with the now-defunct Christian-Social People's Party, it is the oldest extant party in Liechtenstein.

History
The party was established in 1918 by middle class citizens and members of the agricultural community as a response to the formation of the Christian-Social People's Party (VP). It won the majority of the elected the 1918 elections, but the VP formed a government.

The VP won elections in 1922, January 1926 and April 1926, but the FBP won the 1928 elections, and became the party of government until 1938, with Josef Hoop serving as Prime Minister until 1945. In 1938 the FBP allowed the Patriotic Union to join it in a coalition government. The two parties governed in coalition until the 1997 elections, after which the Patriotic Union formed a government. The FBP won the 2001 elections and its leader Otmar Hasler became Prime Minister. Following the 2005 elections the coalition was renewed, with Hasler remaining Prime Minister. The VU's Klaus Tschütscher held the post between 2009 and 2013, after which FBP leader Adrian Hasler became Prime Minister.

Ideology & Policy

LGBT Rights
Compared to the Patriotic Union (VU), members of the FBP are more inclined to support LGBT rights:

a. Percentages do not add up to 100%.

The FBP also voted en bloc with the Free List (FL) party on 6 May 2022 to narrowly defeat a proposed legislation (i.e., Amendment to the Article 25 of the Partnership Act) that would have limited adoption and reproductive rights of same-sex couples.

Electoral history

Landtag elections

Footnotes

External links
Official website 

1918 establishments in Liechtenstein
National conservative parties
Nationalist parties in Europe
Catholic political parties
Political parties established in 1918
Political parties in Liechtenstein
Monarchist parties